Jean-Guy Lagace (born February 5, 1945) is a former professional ice hockey defenceman.  He played in the National Hockey League with the Pittsburgh Penguins, Buffalo Sabres, and Kansas City Scouts; in addition, he played one season in the World Hockey Association with the Birmingham Bulls.

In his NHL career, Lagace played in 197 games, scoring nine goals and adding 39 assists.  In the WHA, Lagace played in 78 games, scoring two goals and adding 25 assists.

Career statistics

Regular season and playoffs

External links

1945 births
Amarillo Wranglers players
Baltimore Clippers players
Birmingham Bulls players
Buffalo Sabres players
Canadian ice hockey defencemen
French Quebecers
Hershey Bears players
Sportspeople from Laval, Quebec
Kansas City Scouts players
Living people
Muskegon Mohawks players
Pittsburgh Penguins players
Ice hockey people from Quebec